Luis Antonio Belisario Velasco Baraona (born 5 January 1936) is a Chilean politician and lawyer who served as Minister of Justice during the first government of Michelle Bachelet (2006–2010).

References

External Links
 Belasco Velasco at El Mostrador

1936 births
Living people
Chilean people
20th-century Chilean politicians
21st-century Chilean politicians
Christian Democratic Party (Chile) politicians